Porta San Pellegrino is a gate in the outer wall of Vatican City. It is located beside Bernini's Colonnade and the small Vatican post; it is also known as Porta Viridaria. The gate was rebuilt by Pope Alexander VI in 1492 and his arms are at the top of the gate. The gate is little used.

On Friday, 6 February, 2015, Catholic News Service (CNS) reported, in a brief online news release on its website, that the Vatican, through a communique, had announced that it had finished remodeling a public bathroom, to include three showers (which the article stated will be open every day except Wednesday, the day of the Pope's general audience, and other times when there are large events in the Basilica and the Square) and a barber's chair (haircuts will be available on Mondays), near Bernini's Colonnade. The services, which will include issuance of kits for hygiene, are meant for the homeless pilgrims of the Vatican.

See also
 Index of Vatican City-related articles

References

External links
 

Buildings and structures in Vatican City
Italy–Vatican City border crossings